Grace Hughes, known as Yorke, is an Australian musician, singer and songwriter from Byron Bay, Australia. Grace supported Ruel on his 2019 'Painkiller' tour. Her song "Wake the City" was featured on the show 9-1-1.

Discography

Extended plays

Singles

References 

Living people
21st-century Australian singers
21st-century Australian women singers
Australian musicians
Australian women pop singers
1998 births